Maxwell McCabe-Lokos (born 1978) is a Canadian actor, screenwriter, director, and musician.

Career 
McCabe-Lokos has appeared in Land of the Dead, Lars and the Real Girl, The Incredible Hulk, Chaos Walking, The Husband, and Antibirth. He has appeared in supporting or guest roles in the television series Happy Town, Being Erica, The Listener, Schitt's Creek, Copper, Lucky 7, and Station Eleven.

He was co-writer of The Husband with Kelly Harms, and has directed the short films Ape Sodom and Midnight Confession. 

McCabe-Lokos directed the feature film Stanleyville, co-written with Rob Benvie.

He was previously a keyboardist for the garage rock band the Deadly Snakes, in which he was known by the stage name Age of Danger. McCabe-Lokos told Damian Abraham on Abraham's 'Turned Out a Punk' podcast that The Beautiful South were the first band he ever saw live. 

He currently resides in Tangier, Morocco and is neighbours with Bernard-Henri Lévy.

Filmography

Film

Television

References

External links

1978 births
21st-century Canadian male actors
21st-century Canadian keyboardists
21st-century Canadian male musicians
Canadian male film actors
Canadian male television actors
Canadian indie rock musicians
Canadian male screenwriters
Male actors from Toronto
Musicians from Toronto
Writers from Toronto
Living people
Canadian rock keyboardists
Film directors from Toronto